Lord Kitchener may refer to:

 Earl Kitchener, a title in the Peerage of the United Kingdom
 Herbert Kitchener, 1st Earl Kitchener (1850–1916), British soldier in the Sudan, the Second Boer War, and First World War
 Lord Kitchener Wants You, a British Army recruitment poster in World War I
 Henry Kitchener, 2nd Earl Kitchener (1846–1937), brother of the 1st Earl Kitchener
 Henry Kitchener, 3rd Earl Kitchener (1919–2011), grandson of the 2nd Earl Kitchener
 Lord Kitchener (calypsonian) (1922–2000), Calypso music singer born Aldwyn Roberts